Alexandrovka is a rural locality (a selo) and the administrative center of Alexandrovskoye Rural Settlement, Ertilsky District, Voronezh Oblast, Russia. The population was 402 as of 2010. There are 12 streets.

Geography 
Alexandrovka is located on the Tokay River, 46 km south of Ertil (the district's administrative centre) by road. Verkhnyaya Maza is the nearest rural locality.

References 

Rural localities in Ertilsky District